Camille Roy (Nicolet, Quebec, July 13, 1911 – Nicolet, Quebec,  March 29, 1969) was a Canadian politician and a three-term Member of the Legislative Assembly of Quebec.

Background

He was born on July 13, 1911 in Nicolet, Centre-du-Québec.  He became a farmer.

Political career

Roy ran as a Union Nationale candidate  in the  district of  Nicolet in the 1952 election and won.  He was re-elected in the 1956 and 1960 elections, but was defeated against Liberal candidate Germain Hébert in the 1962 election.

Retirement

From 1966 to 1969, Roy was a staff member of Clément Vincent, who was  Member of the  provincial legislature.  He died on March 29, 1969.

References

1911 births
1969 deaths
Union Nationale (Quebec) MNAs